Door to Door may refer to:

Business 
 Door-to-door, a sales technique
 Door to Door Storage, a U.S. self-storage company

Film and television 
 Door to Door (film), a 2002 American TV movie about salesman Bill Porter, played by William H. Macy
 Door to Door (1985 film), an American film with cinematography by Reed Smoot
 "Door to Door" (Beavis and Butt-head), an episode of Beavis and Butt-head
 "Door to Door" (Invader Zim), an episode of Invader Zim
 "Door to Door" (Modern Family), an episode of Modern Family

Music 
 Door to Door (album) or the title song, by The Cars, 1987
 Door to Door, a compilation album by Albert King
 "Door to Door", a song by Creedence Clearwater Revival from Mardi Gras
 "Door to Door", a song by FireHouse from Prime Time